Lauriston may refer to:
Lauriston, an area of central Edinburgh, Scotland
Lauriston, Victoria, a town in Australia
Lauriston, New Zealand, a village in New Zealand
Lauriston Castle, a 16th-century tower house in Edinburgh, Scotland
Lauriston Girls' School, a private day and boarding school for girls in Armadale, Victoria, Australia
Lauriston, Strathfield, an historic house in the Sydney suburb of Strathfield, New South Wales, Australia
Jacques Lauriston, a French soldier and diplomat of Scottish descent
Jean Law de Lauriston, twice Governor General of Pondicherry
Jesse Lauriston Livermore, an early-20th-century American stock trader
 Lauriston (HBC vessel), operated by the HBC from 1916 to 1917, see Hudson's Bay Company vessels

See also
 Laurieston (disambiguation)